Britt is both a surname and a given name. Notable people with the name include:

Surname

Music
 Brian A. Britt, American music professor
 Catherine Britt (born 1984), Australian country music artist
 Elton Britt (1913–1972), American country music yodeler and singer
 King Britt (born 1968), American DJ and producer
 Britt Walford (born 1970), American rock drummer

Politics
 Charles Robin Britt (born 1942), U.S. Representative from North Carolina
 Gwendolyn T. Britt (1941–2008), Maryland state senator
 Harry Britt, (1938–2020), American civil rights activist and politician
 Katie Britt (born 1982), American attorney and politician

Athletics
Darren Britt (born 1969), Australian cricketer
Edgar Britt (1913–2017), Australian jockey
Jessie Britt (born 1963), American football player
Justin Britt (born 1991), American football player
Jimmy Britt (1879–1940), American lightweight boxer
Kenny Britt (born 1988), American football player
K. J. Britt (born 1999), American football player
Kris Britt (born 1984), Australian rugby league player
Maurice Britt (1919–1995), American football player, Medal of Honor recipient, and politician
Wesley Britt (born 1981), former American football player

Other
 Chris Britt, editorial cartoonist 
 Clifton Todd Britt, birth name of Lexington Steele (born 1969), pornographic actor
 Jim Britt (1910–1980), American sportscaster
 John J. Britt, American philatelist awarded the Lichtenstein Medal
 May Britt (born 1934), Swedish actress

Given name

Actresses
 Britt Allcroft, English producer, writer, director and voice actress
 Britt Ekland, Swedish actress
 Britt Irvin, Canadian actress, singer and voice-over artist
 Britt McKillip, Canadian actress, singer and voice-over-artist
 Britt Robertson, American actress

Singers
 Britt Daniel, lead singer of the band Spoon
 Britt Irvin, Canadian actress, singer and voice-over artist
 Britt Love, singer with Mini Viva
 Britt McKillip, Canadian actress, singer and voice-over-artist
 Britt Nicole, Christian Pop singer

Other
 Britt Baker (born 1991), American professional wrestler
 Britt Hagedorn, German television presenter
 Britt Olauson (born 1945), Swedish politician
 Britt Raaby, Danish freestyle swimmer

Nickname
 Brittany Benn (born 1989), Canadian rugby union player

Fictional characters

Surname
 Edie Britt, on the TV series Desperate Housewives portrayed by Nicollette Sheridan
 Ponsonby Britt, fictional executive producer of The Rocky and Bullwinkle Show
 Britt, one of the original Magnificent Seven, played by James Coburn

Given name
 Britt Pollack, private investigator on the TV series Terriers, portrayed by Michael Raymond-James
 Britt Ponset, title character in American old-time radio Western The Six Shooter
 Britt Reid, the Green Hornet and the grand nephew of John Reid, the Lone Ranger

Surnames of French origin
French-language surnames
Hypocorisms